Florida Virtual School (FLVS) was founded in 1997 as the first statewide Internet-based public high school in the United States. In 2000, FLVS was established as an independent educational entity by the Florida Legislature. Recognized as its own district within the state, it provides online instruction to Florida students in Kindergarten through 12th grade. As part of the Florida public education system, the online school serves students in all 67 Florida districts. Operating as a public school offering both individual online courses and full-time enrollment options, the school's funding is tied directly to student performance.

History

Florida Virtual School began as a progressive initiative that sought to explore innovative teaching models based on online learning. During the 1996 school year, the Florida Department of Education awarded two counties, Orange and Alachua, with "Break the Mold" grant funds. The $200,000 grant for the legislative project set the stage for FLVS to become the nation’s first statewide online public high school. After a 6-month planning period, the school launched in August 1997 with 77 students and five courses.

Julie Young, former president and CEO of FLVS, describes how "there were no rules and no roadmap for us to follow" as the school was launched. Young, having previously worked as an administrator and technology integration trainer in the Florida education system, was hired to head the project. FLVS became an independent educational entity in 2000. During its first few years following the receipt of its initial grant funding, it was funded as a line item in the state budget.

By 2003, the school had increased to 24,000 half-credit enrollments (considered one segment or semester) and became part of the Florida Education Finance Program (FEFP). It was the first school to directly tie student performance to funding through the reporting of students’ successful half-credit completions. During the 2012–2013 year, FLVS had 410,962 successful half-credit, semester completions based on part-time students. At this time, FLVS also established in-state relationships by forming partnerships with school districts throughout Florida. In 2012–2013, FLVS licensed digital curriculum and provided online learning services to 47 Florida districts.

FLVS is currently affiliated with all 67 Florida school districts and has been followed as a global model for initiatives in distance learning.

Programs

FLVS Flex

Within the state, the Florida Virtual School district offers multiple options at no cost to students who are Florida residents. FLVS Flex allows public, private, or homeschool students to enroll on a per-course basis with rolling enrollment open year-round. Students may take individual courses with FLVS Flex to supplement current studies or as part of a home education program. Because credits are applied to the transcript of a student's local school or toward a homeschool portfolio, students of the FLVS Flex program do not receive a diploma from FLVS. The FLVS course catalog includes more than 190 courses for students in Kindergarten through 12th grade. Courses include core subjects, world languages, electives, honors, and Advanced Placement courses. 

FLVS is accredited by the North Central Association Commission on Accreditation and School Improvement (NCA CASI), Northwest Accreditation Commission (NWAC) and the Southern Association of Colleges and Schools Council on Accreditation and School Improvement (SACS CASI), a division of Cognia. All core courses are NCAA approved.

FLVS Full Time

FLVS Full Time is a full-time public school in the state of Florida that provides online instruction for both elementary, middle and high school students. FLVS Full Time operates on a 180-day calendar following the traditional school year in the United States and is considered attending students' primary school of record. In May 2013, the school celebrated the graduation of its inaugural graduating class which included 250 high school seniors. These students were the first to receive a diploma from FLVS Full Time.

Global School

Outside the state of Florida, students and parents can take individual elementary, middle, and high school courses on a tuition basis through Global School.

School and District Services

FLVS offers training, professional development, and curriculum licensing to educators and school districts both internationally and in Florida. This includes the support of online and blended learning, defined by the Clayton Christensen Institute for Disruptive Innovation as "a formal education program in which a student learns at least in part through online learning, with some element of student control over time, place, path, and/or pace; at least in part in a supervised brick-and-mortar location away from home; and the modalities along each student’s learning path within a course or subject are connected to provide an integrated learning experience." These programs integrate practices from both online and traditional in-person classroom instruction, with online or local teachers providing instruction, support, and supervision.

FLVS is a contracted provider for schools and districts across the United States. This includes 67 Florida school districts, supporting county virtual schools which use FLVS curriculum taught by their local district teachers. School districts may consider FLVS as an option to assist in reducing class size, to provide courses that may not be available or practical to offer, to allow students to accelerate, or to assist remedial students who desire to be on grade level. Schools may also offer online learning to provide a flexible learning environment for students with medical or behavioral conditions or for those pursuing endeavors such as athletics or performing arts.

Funding

Funded through the Florida Education Finance Program (FEFP), full-time equivalent (FTE) students at FLVS are defined by course completion and performance – as opposed to "seat time" in a traditional brick-and-mortar school.

During the spring of 2013, a new legislative funding model changed the FTE allotment received by FLVS for students who attend a brick-and-mortar public school. The new funding formula provides FLVS a portion of the FTE for each public school student and is dependent upon the number of online courses taken. Previously, districts received the full allotment for each student regardless of the number of online courses taken and FLVS received an additional per-course allotment that equaled one-sixth of the FEFP FTE funding. Under the 2013 funding model, FLVS receives one-seventh of the allotment and the district receives six-sevenths if a student takes six courses with their local school and one course online. This is further reduced and divided by the total number of online courses taken. Funding for homeschool and private school students, however, remain the same. FLVS receives less funding for students who take courses through a district franchises. In 2012-2013, the FLVS funding per FTE was $5,195.18.

FLVS is free to Florida residents. Students outside of Florida may take the courses on a tuition basis through Global School.

Legislation

FLVS operates under the guidance of a gubernatorial-appointed Board of Trustees according to Florida Statute (s. 228.082, F.S.).

Florida statute 1003.428 requires all high school students to complete an online course prior to graduation. All Florida students are eligible to take online courses with FLVS and cannot be denied this option by their district per Section 1002.37(3)(c), F.S.

Notable alumni 

 Alexa Pano, professional golfer

Notable staff 

 Mike Miller, politician, Chief of External Affairs
 Felicia Spencer, retired mixed martial artist, sixth-grade algebra teacher

See also
Virtual school
Online classes
E-learning
Blended Learning
Virtual learning environment
List of virtual schools
History of virtual learning environments
Information and communication technologies in education
School choice in Florida

References

Online schools in the United States
American educational websites
Online K–12 schools
Education in Florida
School districts established in 1997
1997 establishments in Florida